Patra ni machhi is an Indian dish originating from Parsi cuisine, which is made from steamed fish topped with chutney and wrapped in a banana leaf.

External links
Patra ni machhi recipe from Parsicuisine.com

Indian cuisine
Indian fish dishes
Parsi cuisine